Meet the Orphans 2: New Generation is the fifth studio album by reggaeton singer Don Omar. It was released on October 20, 2012. It is the sequel to Don Omar's previous album, Meet the Orphans. The previews of three songs were released through YouTube on April 17, 2012. One is called Tus Movimientos featuring Natti Natasha, the second one is called Zumba and the third one is called Dame Una Llamada featuring Syko El Terror.
In the official website of Orphanato Music Group it is said that "the album will contain 14 songs that will make history in music". The album debuted at No. 1 on the Billboard Top Latin Albums chart.  The album was top 5 in billboard in 2012 and the No. 1 spot on the Latin artists.  The album was record history in Billboard.  The album was top 36 decade in Billboard. and was top 1 Top Latin Albums Chart in Billboard. and is the album most download for Billboard in 2013.  The album was released on August 12, 2012 in Japan.

The artis Don Omar was Top Latin artists in the year for Billboard in 2012.

It is Omar's first album to include the Parental Advisory label. The track Zumba is featured in the video game, Zumba Fitness Core.

The album won 2  Latin Grammy Award for Best Urban Music Album at 13th Annual Latin Grammy Awards and Best Urban Song. and was nominated for the Urban Album of the Year same award at the Lo Nuestro Awards. It won 10 Billboard Latin Music Award for Latin Rhythm Album of the Year in 2013, and  the album and artist was nominated with 18 nominations in 2013. the album was nominated for Latin Rhythm Album of the Year in 2014.  the album sold  2,2 million singles worldwide.

Track listing

Bonus Tracks for international albums: Songs from Meet the Orphans

Charts

Weekly charts

Year-end charts

See also
List of number-one Billboard Latin Albums from the 2010s
2012 in Latin music

References 

2012 albums
Don Omar albums
Machete Music albums
Latin Grammy Award for Best Urban Music Album